The Sheriff of Traquair was historically the royal official responsible for enforcing law and order in Traquair, Scotland. The office was merged in 1293 into the office of Sheriff of Peebles

Sheriffs of Traquair

Gilbert Fraser (1241)
Simon Fraser (1263-1265)
William Perel (1288-1293)
In 1293 the sheriffdom was merged into the sheriffdom of Peebles.

References
Taylor, Alice; The Shape of the State in Medieval Scotland, 1124-1290 (2016).

Sheriff courts
Peeblesshire